

Champions

Major League Baseball
World Series: St. Louis Cardinals over New York Yankees (4-1)
All-Star Game, July 6 at Polo Grounds: American League, 3-1

Other champions
Amateur World Series: Cuba
Negro World Series: Kansas City Monarchs over Homestead Grays (4-0)
Negro League Baseball All-Star Game: East, 5-2
Minor leagues
Northern League: Winnipeg Maroons

Awards and honors
Baseball Hall of Fame
Rogers Hornsby
Most Valuable Player
Joe Gordon (AL) – New York Yankees (2B)
Mort Cooper (NL) – St. Louis Cardinals (P)
The Sporting News Player of the Year Award
Ted Williams – Boston Red Sox (LF)
The Sporting News Most Valuable Player Award
Joe Gordon (AL) – New York Yankees (2B)
Mort Cooper (NL) – St. Louis Cardinals (P)
The Sporting News Manager of the Year Award
Billy Southworth – St. Louis Cardinals

Ted Williams was MLB Triple Crown winner.

Major league baseball final standings

American League final standings

National League final standings

Negro league baseball final standings

Negro American League final standings

Negro National League final standings

Events

January–March
January 14 – The Boston Red Sox release catcher Moe Berg. Berg would go on the greater fame as one of the top U.S. spies during World War II.
January 15 – President Franklin Delano Roosevelt sent a letter to Commissioner Kenesaw Mountain Landis, encouraging Major League Baseball to continue playing despite American entry into World War II. Roosevelt's famed "Green Light" letter ensured that the 1942 season would be played as planned, negating rumors of a shutdown following the attack on Pearl Harbor. Despite a loss of many star players to military service, such as Joe DiMaggio, Bob Feller & Ted Williams, all 16 teams continued to play regular schedules for the duration of World War II.
February 12 – Minor league outfielder Gordon Houston becomes the first player in Organized Baseball to die during active duty in World War II.
March 18 – Jackie Robinson and Nate Moreland request try-outs with the White Sox. Sox manager Jimmie Dykes praises Robinson's baserunning to Pittsburgh Courier sportswriter Herman Hill, saying that "he stole everything but my infielders' gloves." Dykes goes on record to the Courier, saying "Personally, I would welcome Negro players on the White Sox and I believe every one of the other 15 managers would do so likewise.  As for the players, they'd all get along too."  Ultimately, Dykes is unable to even consider offering contracts to either, stating that it is a matter for club owners, league officials, and the Commissioner of Baseball to allow it.

April–June
June 2 – Ted Williams of the Boston Red Sox enlists in the United States Navy.
May 13 – Jim Tobin of the Boston Braves almost single-handedly beats the Chicago Cubs at Braves Field, 6–5, by pitching a five-hitter and hitting three consecutive home runs. Tobin, who hit a pinch-homer the day before, becomes the only pitcher in modern history to collect three home runs in a Major League game. His fourth at-bat results in a fly ball caught against the fence in left field.
 The St. Louis Browns purchase the contract of Babe Dahlgren, who became part of baseball lore when he replaced Lou Gehrig at first base for the Yankees, thus ending the consecutive playing streak, from the Chicago Cubs. Less than a week later, the Browns return him to the Cubs, who then sell his contract to the Brooklyn Dodgers. 
June 1 – Jimmie Foxx, who'd been placed on waivers by the Boston Red Sox, is claimed by the Chicago Cubs.  
June 19 – Paul Waner of the Boston Braves joins the 3,000 hit club.
June 26 – Shortly after an Army baseball game, Chicago White Sox minor league pitcher Gene Stack dies from a fatal heart attack, making him the first major league player drafted into military service to die on active duty.

July–September
July 6 – At the Polo Grounds, home of the New York Giants, the American League defeated the National League, 3-1, in the All–Star Game.
July 19 – Boston Red Sox pitcher Mike Ryba catches both games of a doubleheader against the Cleveland Indians at Fenway Park.
August 23 – Babe Ruth dons a uniform for the first time in 7 years for a hitting exhibition against Walter Johnson at Yankee Stadium. On Johnson's fifth pitch, Ruth hit a drive into the lower right field stands as the crowd thundered its approval. On the final pitch, Ruth hit a towering upper-deck shot that was just foul. He circled the bases doffing his cap and saluting the roaring crowd with every step. Ruth and Johnson then left the field together to a thunderous ovation. $80,000 was raised for the Army-Navy relief fund.
September 11 – Chicago Cubs catcher Paul Gillespie homers in his first major league at bat.  In 1945 he will homer in his final major league at bat and become the only player in MLB history to do both.
September 13 – In the second inning of a doubleheader at Braves Field, Lennie Merullo commits four errors in the second inning of the Chicago Cubs' 12-8 victory over the Boston Braves. Merullo had just been informed by Cubs owner Philip K. Wrigley that his wife had just delivered their first child, son Len Jr. The next day, the Chicago newspapers suggest that the newborn be nicknamed "Boots" in honor of the occasion.
September 27 – The St. Louis Cardinals clinch the National League pennant on the last day of the regular season by defeating the Chicago Cubs, 9-2, in the first game of a double header at Sportsman's Park, St. Louis. The Cardinals also win Game 2 of the double header and finish the season with a record of 106-48, giving them the most victories by any National League team since Pittsburgh's 110 wins in 1909. Meanwhile, the Brooklyn Dodgers win their season finale, 4-3, against Philadelphia to end the season in second place at 104-50.
September 29 – The Kansas City Monarchs defeat the Washington-Homestead Grays 9 to 5 at Shibe Park in Philadelphia and sweep the 1942 Negro World Series four games to none.  Satchel Paige pitches 5 hitless innings in relief to shut down the Grays and clinch the title.

October–December
October 5 – The St. Louis Cardinals defeat the New York Yankees, 4-2, in Game 5 of the World Series to win their fourth World Championship, four games to one. The loss was the Yankees' first since the 1926 World Series to the Cardinals. They had won eight Series in the interim.
November 1 – The Brooklyn Dodgers name Branch Rickey as the team president, replacing Larry MacPhail who enters the military service. Rickey had resigned as vice-president of the St. Louis Cardinals only three days earlier.
December 1 – At major league meetings in Chicago, World War II travel restrictions are the order of the day. Owners decide to restrict travel to a three-trip schedule rather than the customary four. Spring training in 1943 will be limited to locations north of the Potomac or Ohio rivers and east of the Mississippi.

Movies
The Pride of the Yankees

Births

January
January 1 – Bill Bethea
January 3 – Epy Guerrero
January 5 – Wally Wolf
January 7 – Jim Lefebvre
January 11 – Danny Napoleon
January 14 – Dave Campbell
January 14 – Billy Parker
January 18 – Dick Estelle
January 25 – Ernie Fazio

February
February 4 – Joe Sparma
February 8 – Fritz Peterson
February 8 – Costen Shockley
February 9 – Hal Gilson
February 12 – Steve Bailey
February 12 – Pat Dobson
February 15 – Bill Henry
February 16 – Tim Cullen
February 21 – Fred Newman

March
March 3 – Don Dennis
March 3 – Bob Garibaldi
March 8 – Dick Allen
March 8 – George Gerberman
March 9 – Bert Campaneris
March 10 – Tom Hilgendorf
March 12 – Jim Wynn
March 13 – Marv Staehle
March 14 – Bob Raudman
March 21 – Len Church
March 23 – Danny Coombs
March 24 – Jesús Alou
March 26 – Mel Queen
March 30 – Conrad Cardinal

April
April 1 – Jake Jaeckel
April 4 – Tom Fisher
April 4 – Jim Fregosi
April 4 – Ron Locke
April 5 – Peter Magowan
April 6 – John Wojcik
April 7 – Tom Phoebus
April 8 – José Herrera
April 12 – Dale Roberts
April 12 – Tommie Sisk
April 13 – Ike Brown
April 16 – Jim Lonborg
April 18 – Steve Blass
April 18 – Chuck Taylor
April 19 – Aaron Pointer

May
May 7 – John Flavin
May 9 – Jerry Buchek
May 12 – Ted Kubiak
May 13 – Billy MacLeod
May 14 – Tony Pérez
May 26 – Chuck Hartenstein
May 28 – Buddy Booker
May 30 – John Felske

June
June 1 – Randy Hundley
June 1 – Ken McMullen
June 3 – Duane Josephson
June 6 – Bill Davis
June 8 – Larry Colton
June 8 – Pete Magrini
June 17 – Luis Peraza
June 22 – Roy Heiser
June 27 – Danny Breeden
June 28 – Tom Fletcher

July
July 4 – Hal Lanier
July 11 – John Sevcik
July 14 – Juan Ríos
July 15 – Don Bosch
July 16 – John Purdin
July 17 – Don Kessinger
July 20 – Mickey Stanley
July 21 – Mike Hegan
July 22 – Frank Johnson
July 24 – Cotton Nash
July 26 – José Martínez
July 27 – Jack Hiatt

August
August 4 – Ángel Bravo
August 4 – Cleon Jones
August 7 – Gary Dotter
August 9 – Tommie Agee
August 11 – Sal Campisi
August 15 – Cap Peterson
August 20 – Fred Norman
August 23 – Dave Dowling
August 23 – Danny Murphy
August 25 – Shaun Fitzmaurice
August 29 – Dan Schneider
August 31 – Tom Dukes
August 31 – Ramón Webster

September
September 5 – Dave Morehead
September 8 – Steve Hargan
September 9 – Ron Stone
September 21 – Sam McDowell
September 21 – Bill Wilson
September 23 – Jim Rooker
September 23 – Woody Woodward
September 24 – Chuck Nieson
September 28 – Grant Jackson

October
October 6 – Jerry Grote
October 8 – Bill Landis
October 13 – Bob Bailey
October 16 – Pete Lovrich
October 17 – Pete Cimino
October 18 – Vern Holtgrave
October 18 – Willie Horton
October 22 – Cecil Upshaw
October 31 – Dave McNally

November
November 2 – Ron Reed
November 4 – Jack Whillock
November 5 – Richie Scheinblum
November 6 – Jim Gosger
November 19 – Larry Haney
November 23 – Jerry Nyman
November 24 – Fred Beene
November 25 – Bobby Etheridge

December
December 3 – José Peña
December 4 – Dick Billings
December 5 – Steve Shea
December 6 – Arnold Umbach
December 7 – Alex Johnson
December 13 – Ferguson Jenkins
December 14 – Jim Roland
December 21 – Pete Charton
December 22 – Jack Jenkins
December 23 – Jerry Koosman
December 27 – Byron Browne

Deaths

January
January   4 – Herold Juul, 48, pitcher for the 1914 Brooklyn Tip-Tops of the Federal League.
January   8 – Harry Pearce, 52, second baseman who played from 1917 through 1919 for the Philadelphia Phillies.
January 22 – Louis Santop, 52, Hall of Fame catcher in the Negro leagues, an amazing .406 lifetime hitter and the first legitimate home run slugger in black baseball history.
January 31 – Henry Larkin, 82, 19th century first baseman and manager who hit .303 in 10 seasons with the Philadelphia Athletics, Cleveland Infants/Indians and Washington Senators.
January 31 – Ed Phelps, 62, catcher who played with four teams in 11 seasons spanning 1902–1913, and a member of the Pittsburgh Pirates teams who the 1902 and 1903 National League Pennants and played in the 1903 World Series.

February
February   3 – Frank Luce, 45, outfielder who played for the Pittsburgh Pirates in the 1923 season.
February   3 – Happy Finneran, 51, pitcher who played for the Philadelphia Phillies, Brooklyn Tip-Tops, Detroit Tigers and New York Yankees, in a span of five seasons from 1912–1918.
February   7 – Joe Poetz, 41, pitcher who played in two games for the New York Giants in 1926.
February   9 – John Fischer, 86, pitcher who played from 1884 to 1885 with the Philadelphia Keystones and the Buffalo Bisons.
February 16 – Orson Baldwin, 60, pitcher for the 1908 St. Louis Cardinals.

March
March   1 – Bill Delaney, 78, second baseman for the 1890 Cleveland Spiders of the National League.
March   3 – John Buckley, 72, pitcher who played with the Buffalo Bisons of the Players' League in 1890. 
March   3 – Clay Fauver, 69, pitcher who played for the Louisville Colonels of the National League in 1899, and also a distinguished college professor and athletic coach both in baseball and football. 
March   3 – Dan O'Connor, 73, Canadian first baseman who appeared in six games with the Louisville Colonels club who won the 1890 American Association pennant.
March   4 – Jack Hammond, 51, second baseman who played for the Cleveland Indians in 1915 and divided his playing time with Cleveland and the Pittsburgh Pirates in 1922.
March   5 – Dutch Wetzel, 48, outfielder who played for the St. Louis Browns of the American League in the 1920 and 1921 seasons.
March 12 – Owen Conway, 51, third baseman who played for the Philadelphia Athletics during the 1915 season.
March 13 – Gene Steere, 69, shortstop for the 1894 Pittsburgh Pirates.
March 26 – Jimmy Burke, 67, third baseman for the St. Louis Cardinals from 1903 to 1905 and player-manager of the club for part of 1905, who then moved to the Minor Leagues to manage several teams, returning to the majors  to coach for the Detroit Tigers, Boston Red Sox, Chicago Cubs and New York Yankees between 1914 and 1933, while managing the St. Louis Browns from 1918 to 1920.
March 31 – Ray O'Brien, 47, backup outfielder for the 1916 Pittsburgh Pirates.

April
April   3 – John Rudderham, 78, left fielder who appeared in one game with the Boston Reds of the Union Association in its 1884 season.
April   8 – Pat Bohen, 51, pitcher who played from 1913 to 1914 for the Philadelphia Athletics and the Pittsburgh Pirates.
April 11 – Norm McNeil, 49, reserve catcher who played briefly for the Boston Red Sox during the 1919 season. 
April 26 – Al Montgomery, 21, catcher who played for the Boston Braves in 1941.
April 26 – Hack Simmons, 57, infielder and outfielder who spent two seasons in the American League with the Detroit Tigers (1910) and New York Highlanders (1912), before moving to the outlaw Federal League to play for the Baltimore Terrapins (1914–1915).

May
May   9 – Herm Malloy, 56, pitcher for the Detroit Tigers teams who won the American League pennants in the 1907 and 1908 seasons.
May 13 – C. J. McDiarmid, 72, executive with the St. Louis Browns and Cincinnati Reds between 1907 and 1929; president and principal owner of Reds from 1927 to 1929.
May 15 – Larry Milton, 63, pitcher who played for the St. Louis Cardinals in its 1903 season.
May 20 – Amby McConnell, 59, second baseman who played from 1908 through 1911 for the Boston Red Sox and Chicago White Sox, better known as the player that lined into the first unassisted triple play in Major League Baseball history (1909), and also for setting the Red Sox record for most stolen bases in a single-season by a rookie with 31 (1908), which stood until being broken by Jacoby Ellsbury (2008).
May 25 – Bill James, 65, pitcher who played for five teams in all or part of eight seasons between 1911 and 1919, as well as one of the clean members on the 1919 Chicago White Sox club which was made famous by the Black Sox Scandal.
May 26 – Ed Gremminger, 68, third baseman who played for the Cleveland Spiders, Boston Beaneaters and Detroit Tigers in part of four seasons between 1895 and 1904.
May 28 – Charley Bassett, 79, infielder for five National League teams in a span of eight seasons from 1884–1892, who led the league's second basemen in assists in 1887, and fielding percentage in 1887 and 1890.
May 28 – Mike Welday, 63, outfielder who played for the Chicago White Sox in the 1907 and 1909 seasons.
May 30 – Ed Burns, 54, catcher who played from 1912 to 1918 for the St. Louis Cardinals and Philadelphia Phillies.
May 30 – Lee Fyfe, 62, umpire who officiated in the Federal League in 1915 and the National League in 1920.

June
June   1 – Danny Friend, 69, pitcher who played for the Chicago Colts of the National League from 1895 through 1898.
June 10 – Matt Zieser, 53, pitcher for the 1914 Boston Red Sox.
June 26 – Gene Stack, 24, pitcher in the Chicago White Sox minor league system, who in December 1940 became the first player on a Major League roster to be drafted for World War II service.
June 29 – Manuel Cueto, 50, Cuban outfielder who spent more than 20 years in professional baseball, including stints with the St. Louis Terriers in 1914 and the Cincinnati Reds from 1917 until 1919.
June 30 – Cad Coles, 56, outfielder who played for the 1914 Kansas City Packers of the Federal League.

July
July   1 – Harry Spies, 76, first baseman and catcher who played for the Louisville Colonels and Cincinnati Reds during the 1895 season.
July 17 – Lefty Johnson, 79, outfielder for the Philadelphia Keystones, Indianapolis Hoosiers and Baltimore Orioles in parts of five seasons from 1884–1892.
July 20 – Rap Dixon, 39, All-Star outfielder in the Negro leagues from 1922 through 1937; a power hitter who could also hit for average as well as one of the fastest players and best defensive outfielders in Negro league history.
July 30 – Jim Baskette, 54, pitcher for the Cleveland Naps from 1911 until 1913.

August
August   3 – Jack Hayden, 61, outfielder who played for the Philadelphia Athletics, Boston Americans and Chicago Cubs in the early 20th century.
August   6 – Gordon McNaughton, 32, pitcher for the 1932 Boston Red Sox.

September
September   2 – Henry Thielman, 61, pitcher for the New York Giants, Cincinnati Reds and Brooklyn Superbas from 1902 until 1903.
September 26 – Joe Giannini, 54, shortstop for the 1911 Boston Red Sox.

October
October   3 – Pinky Hargrave, 46, catcher for the Washington Senators, St. Louis Browns, Detroit Tigers and Boston Braves between 1923 and 1930.

November
November   8 – Birdie Cree, 60, outfielder who spent his entire career with the New York Highlanders/Yankees from 1908–1915, while hitting .292 in 742 games.
November 14 – Scrappy Carroll, 82, Outfielder for three teams from 1884–1887.
November 15 – Joe Gunson, 79, catcher/outfielder who played four seasons in the majors from 1884, 1889, 1892–1893.
November 24 – Frank Owen, 62, pitcher for the Detroit Tigers and Chicago White Sox from 1901–1908, who posted an 82-67 with a 2,55 ERA.
November 30 – Slim Love, 52, pitcher who posted a 28-21 record with a 3.04 ERA in six seasons with the Senators, Yankees and Tigers.

December
December   1 – Frank Connaughton, 73, shortstop-outfielder who played in the National League for Boston (1894 and 1906) and New York (1896).
December   3 – Chad Kimsey, 36, appeared in 222 games, 198 as a pitcher, for the St. Louis Browns, Chicago White Sox and Detroit Tigers over six seasons between 1929 and 1936.
December   5 – Val Picinich, 46, catcher in 1307 games for the Philadelphia Athletics, Washington Senators, Boston Red Sox, Cincinnati Reds, Brooklyn Robins/Dodgers and Pittsburgh Pirates between 1916 and 1933.
December   6 – Amos Rusie, 71, Hall of Fame fireball pitcher whose powerful delivery was the main reason to move the pitching mound in 1893 from 50 feet to its present 60 feet, 6 inches; who retired with a 246-174 record, 1,950 strikeouts and 3.07 ERA  in what was really an eight-year career with the New York Giants, collecting 30 or more wins four years in a row and winning 20 or more games eight successive times, while leading the National League in strikeouts five years and leading or tying for most shutouts five times, including a no-hitter, and the Triple Crown in 1894 with a 36-13 mark, 195 strikeouts and a 2.78 ERA en route to a 4–0 four-game sweep of the Baltimore Orioles in the first Temple Cup Championship Series.

References

External links

Baseball Reference – 1942 MLB Season Summary  
Baseball Reference – MLB Players born  in 1942
Baseball Almanac – MLB Players died in 1942